Nutter Butter is an American sandwich cookie brand, first introduced in 1969 and currently owned by Nabisco, which is a subsidiary of Mondelez International. It is claimed to be the best-selling U.S. peanut butter sandwich cookie, with around a billion estimated to be eaten every year.

Brand history
The distinctive design was thought to have been created by William A. Turnier but Nabisco maintains that there is "no way of knowing who came up with the actual visual concept".

In December 2017, a Nutter Butter cereal line was launched by Post Consumer Brands. It debuted at Walmart with a box retailing at around $4.

In October 2018, Krispy Kreme released Nutter Butter and Chips Ahoy! doughnuts which joined the pre-existing Oreo doughnuts. The next year, in January 2019, chocolate fudge-covered Nutter Butters were released alongside similarly covered Oreos.

In May 2019, the CEO of Mondelez International, Dirk Van de Put announced in an interview with CNBC that the company was giving "serious consideration" to adding CBD to certain product lines such as Nutter Butter. He did however say that adding CBD to its family brands "may not be in the company's best interest". Among other products, Nutter Butter was noted as helping increase Mondelez's sales in 2019, despite being one of the company's smaller brands.

Starting in January 2020, Nabisco began selling Nutter Butter at supermarkets in Canada (as with Nabisco's other snack brands, Nutter Butter are sold under the Christie brand in Canada).

References

External links

 

Cookie sandwiches
Mondelez International brands
Nabisco brands
Products introduced in 1969
Peanut butter confectionery